Alexander Antony Parsons (born 7 September 1992) is an English footballer who plays as a midfielder for Worthing. He made his debut in Football League One for AFC Bournemouth in 2012.

Career
Parsons was born in Worthing, West Sussex. He joined AFC Bournemouth on a two-year scholarship in the summer of 2009, and signed his first professional contract at the end of his scholarship. In August 2011, Parsons and Dan Strugnell joined Southern League Division One club Wimborne Town on a three-month loan deal.

He made his professional debut for Bournemouth on 2 January 2012, in a 2–0 League Two win over Wycombe Wanderers, coming on as a late substitute for Marc Pugh. Two weeks later, he joined Southern League Premier Division Bashley on a one-month loan. Parsons was released at the end of the season by new manager Paul Groves. He is currently training with the Nike Football Academy after being on trial with Brighton & Hove Albion.

References

External links

Bashley Stats at Aylesbury United
 http://www.nike.com/nikefootball/academy/meet-the-team?locale=en_GB

1992 births
Living people
English footballers
Sportspeople from Worthing
Association football midfielders
AFC Bournemouth players
Wimborne Town F.C. players
Bashley F.C. players
Whitehawk F.C. players
Bognor Regis Town F.C. players
Southern Football League players
English Football League players